Lefteris Giovanidis (Greek: Λευτέρης Γιοβανίδης) is a theatre director and translator from Greece. A tireless director, on and off the stage. Lefteris, has a reputation as an astute artistic director of theaters, and has for many years been a highly regarded stage director as well. He is the current artistic director of the Municipal Theatre of Piraeus. He was also the artistic director of the Municipal and Regional Theatre of Kozani.

Biography 
He studied at the Drama School of Athens supervised by director Giorgos Theodosiadis and he graduated in 1995. After his graduation he worked for two years as an actor in Athens and in 1997 he moved to New York, USA in order to study stage directing at Michael Howard Studio and Herbert Bergohof Studio. He also attended courses at Actor’s Studio NYC. During his stay in USA he worked at the beginning as assistant director and then he made his inaugural works as a director. He returned to Greece in 2000.

Until now Giovanidis has directed 46 plays, he has translated 14 more plays to Greek and he has made 6 adaptations of books for theatre. Moreover, he directed the medal ceremonies of the Athens Olympics and Paralympics Games in 2004 and the opening ceremony for the 2007 World Rhythmic Gymnastics Championships in Patras. He has instructed drama and improvisation-classes at the Drama School of National Theatre of Northern Greece.

Giovanidis has co-operated with theatres and institutions like National Theatre of Greece, National Theatre of Northern Greece,  (Gradsko kazalište Marina Držića), Patras Municipal and Regional Theatre, Foundation of the Hellenic World, Michael Cacoyannis Foundation, Athens Festival etc.

Theatre

References 

Greek theatre directors
Greek directors
Greek male actors
Greek translators
Living people
Place of birth missing (living people)
Year of birth missing (living people)